Tamgha-i-Difaa is a Pakistani general campaign medal and is awarded along with a clasp to all ranks who take part in minor operations or campaigns within a laid down period, dates and prescribed qualifying area.

See also 
 Awards and decorations of the Pakistan Armed Forces

References

External links 
 Decorations and Medals of Pakistan
 Military Awards of Pakistan (archived 5 July 2009)

Military awards and decorations of Pakistan